Pop Go the Wiggles! is the 27th album release from Australian children's music group the Wiggles. This album won the 2007 Aria Award for Best Children's album.

Track listing
 Pop! Goes the Weasel (Sam)
 This Old Man
 Murray Had a Turtle
 Hickory Dickory Dock
 English Country Garden
 Pop! Goes the Weasel (Anthony)
 Here We Go Round the Mulberry Bush
 Pussycat, Pussycat
 See-Saw, Margery Daw
 Teddy Bear, Teddy Bear, Turn Around
 Pop! Goes the Weasel (Jeff)
 Mary Had a Little Lamb
 Skip to My Lou
 Three Little Kittens
 Two Fine Gentlemen
 Gregory Griggs
 Hey Diddle Diddle
 Pop! Goes the Weasel (Murray)
 Frere Jacques
 Twinkle, Twinkle Little Star
 There Was a Princess
 The Grand Old Duke of York
 The Farmer in the Dell
 Ring-a-Ring O'Rosie
 Oranges and Lemons
 Miss Polly Had a Dolly
 Jack and Jill
 Lavenders Blue
 Little Bo-Peep
 London Bridge
 Little Miss Muffet
 Chi-Baba, Chi-Baba
 Did You Ever See a Lassie?
 Pat-a-Cake
 Dry Bones
 Incy Wincy Spider

Tour
Promoted by tour during 2008

Video
The Wiggles made the "Pop Go the Wiggles!" video in September 2007.

Song and Rhyme List

 "This Old Man"
 "Pop Goes the Weasel"  (Sam)
 "Skip to My Lou"
 "Murray Had a Turtle"
 "Hickory Dickory Dock"
 "English Country Garden"
 "Round the Garden Like a Teddy Bear"
 "Here We Go 'Round the Mulberry Bush"
 "Pussycat, Pussycat"
 "What Do You Suppose?"
 "See-Saw, Margery Daw"
 "Teddy Bear, Teddy Bear, Turn Around"
 "Mary Had a Little Lamb"
 "Pop Goes the Weasel" (Anthony)
 "Three Little Kittens"
 "Two Fine Gentlemen"
 "Gregory Griggs"
 "Hey Diddle Diddle"
 "Frere Jacques"
 "Twinkle, Twinkle, Little Star"
 "Pop Goes the Weasel" (Jeff)
 "There Was a Princess"
 "Diddle, Diddle, Dumpling, My Son John"
 "Incy Wincy Spider"
 "It's Raining, It's Pouring"
 "Little Miss Muffet"
 "The Grand Old Duke of York"
 "The Farmer in the Dell"
 "Ring-a-Ring O'Rosie"
 "A Star"
 "Oranges and Lemons"
 "Pop Goes the Weasel" (Murray)
 "Miss Polly Had a Dolly"
 "Jack and Jill"
 "Lavenders Blue"
 "Little Bo-Peep"
 "Cobbler, Cobbler"
 "London Bridge Is Falling Down"
 "Chi-Baba, Chi-Baba"
 "Did You Ever See a Lassie?"
 "Pat-a-Cake"
 "Dry Bones"

External links

The Wiggles videos
The Wiggles albums
2007 video albums
2007 albums
ARIA Award-winning albums
Nursery rhymes albums
Australian children's musical films